The Pusher film trilogy by the Danish film director Nicolas Winding Refn illustrates and explores the violent criminal underworld of Copenhagen in gritty realism. The films have been highly praised by critics and hold respective scores of 83%, 100% and 93% on Rotten Tomatoes.

Each film is led by a different lead character; Frank (Kim Bodnia), a mid-level drug dealer in the first, his friend and associate Tonny (Mads Mikkelsen), in the second, and their boss Milo (Zlatko Burić), a Serbian gang leader, in the third. Milo is the only character to appear in all three films, with Burić also reprising his role in the 2012 English language remake.

Films

Original series

Pusher (1996)

The first film follows Frank for a week, a mid-level drug dealer who becomes indebted to his supplier, Milo. It depicts his depravity and how his actions force him further and further out on thin ice while revealing the bittersweet relationship he has with his girlfriend, Vic.

The film was a success, not only in Denmark, but internationally, and launched both Refn's and Mads Mikkelsen's careers.

Pusher II (2004)

The second film follows Frank's low-level criminal sidekick, Tonny. It illustrates how Tonny is rooted in an evil spiral of crime and drugs, his relationship towards his notorious, cynical father and how he adapts to the consequence of becoming a father himself. According to film critic Robert Abele of the Los Angeles Times "in Refn's skilled street-realist hands, the child becomes a potent, wailing metaphor for Tonny's own dilemma of rudderless need".

Pusher 3 (2005)

The third film depicts a day in the life of Serbian drug lord Milo.  Milo, who was a feared and respected man in the first two films, has since aged. He does not have the same grip on the underworld that he used to and is now slowly losing the battle against a younger generation of immigrants, who now want a piece of the action. The film shows Milo's downfall and his desperate attempt to reclaim the throne.

Remakes

Pusher (2010)
A Hindi remake of the same name, starring, written and directed by Assad Raja, was released in 2010.

Pusher (2012)

An English-language remake of the same name, starring Richard Coyle, was released in 2012, with Zlatko Burić reprising his role as Milo from the original trilogy.

Main characters 
 A dark gray cell indicates that the character was not in the film or that the character's presence in the film has yet to be announced.
 An  indicates an appearance through archival footage or stills.
 A  indicates a cameo role.
 A  indicates an uncredited role.

 Pusher: Frank (Kim Bodnia), a mid-level drug dealer. 
 Pusher, Pusher II: Tonny (Mads Mikkelsen), Frank's troubled and impulsive punk-rock friend.
 Pusher, Pusher II, Pusher 3: Milo (Zlatko Burić), a Serbo-Danish gang leader, ruler of the Copenhagen underworld, and the only character to appear in all three films. Burić also reprises his role in the 2012 English language remake.

Reception
Writing for The New York Times, critic Nathan Lee said of the trilogy: "From the mean streets of Copenhagen—they evidently exist—comes the Pusher trilogy, a pungent dose of Denmark rot. Written and directed by Nicolas Winding Refn, this tough trio of underworld thrillers sticks so close to its rogues' gallery of gangsters, suckers and murderous megalomaniacs that you can almost taste the hate and smell the stomach wounds. Given an appetite for grisly crime flicks, they make for a delectably nasty epic".

References

External links
 
 
 

Pusher (film series)
Films directed by Nicolas Winding Refn
Gangster films
Films about organized crime in Denmark
Films about the illegal drug trade
Danish film series
Films about the Serbian Mafia
Trilogies